Graebel Companies, Inc., with global headquarters in Aurora, Colorado, is an American privately held company that provides corporate relocation services, offering end-to-end assignment management solutions, policy consulting, and administration of global mobility programs.

History 
The company was founded by David Graebel in 1950. The company started with one moving truck in Wausau, Wisconsin. David performed scheduling, driving, delivering, loading and unloading tasks at the beginning, and later branched out to offering services across the state of Wisconsin.

As years passed, the company started serving customers across the U.S. and became an independent van line company in the early 1980s. Around the same time, the company relocated its headquarters to Colorado.  

By 1996, the company launched its relocation and assignment management services, and in 2008 it opened its first international satellite office in Prague.  

In 2015, Graebel Companies, Inc., divested Graebel Van Lines to focus exclusively on workforce and commercial moving. Graebel Van Lines operated independently before shutting down in 2017.

References 

Moving companies of the United States
American companies established in 1950
Companies based in Aurora, Colorado